Elaphromyia is a genus of tephritid  or fruit flies in the family Tephritidae.

Species
Elaphromyia adatha (Walker, 1849)
Elaphromyia fissa Munro, 1957
Elaphromyia hardyi Wang, 1996
Elaphromyia incompleta Shiraki, 1933
Elaphromyia magna Hardy, 1988
Elaphromyia multisetosa Shiraki, 1933
Elaphromyia pallida Bezzi, 1926
Elaphromyia pterocallaeformis (Bezzi, 1913)
Elaphromyia siva Frey, 1917
Elaphromyia transversa Hardy, 1988
Elaphromyia yunnanensis Wang, 1990

References

Tephritinae
Tephritidae genera
Diptera of Africa
Diptera of Asia